The MTV Movie Award for Best Fight is an award presented to actors and characters for quality fight scenes in films at the MTV Movie Awards, a ceremony established in 1992. Honors in several categories are awarded by MTV at the annual ceremonies, and are chosen by public vote. The MTV Movie Award for Best Fight was first presented in 1996 to Adam Sandler and Bob Barker for their fight in Happy Gilmore. Uma Thurman won the award in 2004 and 2005 for her fights against Chiaki Kuriyama and Daryl Hannah in Kill Bill: Volume 1 and Volume 2, respectively. In 2008 and 2009, Cam Gigandet was presented with the honor for his fights in Never Back Down and Twilight. Robert Pattinson has also won the award twice, for his appearances in The Twilight Saga films: Twilight in 2009, and The Twilight Saga: Eclipse in 2011. Jackie Chan has won the Best Fight honor once from four nominations. Jet Li and Chris Tucker have each received three nominations, and Brad Pitt, Hugh Jackman, Hayden Christensen, and Ewan McGregor have each been nominated twice.

Winners and nominees

References

MTV Movie & TV Awards